This is a list of moths of the family Coleophoridae that are found in Turkey. It also acts as an index to the species articles and forms part of the full List of moths of Turkey.

Augasma aeratellum Zeller, 1839
Coleophora adelogrammella Zeller, 1849
Coleophora adjectella Hering, 1937
Coleophora adjunctella Hodgkinson, 1882
Coleophora agrianella Rebel, 1934
Coleophora albicostella Duponchel, 1842
Coleophora albipennella Staudinger, 1879
Coleophora albostraminata Toll, 1960
Coleophora albotitae Rebel, 1935
Coleophora amasicola Toll, 1942
Coleophora amasiella Stainton, 1867
Coleophora amentastra Falkovitsh, 1972
Coleophora amethystinella Ragonot, 1885
Coleophora ammophora Falkovitsh, 1989
Coleophora arenbergeri Glaser, 1981
Coleophora argentifimbriata Walsingham, 1907
Coleophora argentipennella Duponchel, 1838
Coleophora argentula Stephens, 1834
Coleophora argyrella Herrich-Schäffer, 1861
Coleophora artemisiella Scott, 1861
Coleophora asiaeminoris Toll, 1952
Coleophora asthenella Constant, 1893
Coleophora astragalella Zeller, 1849
Coleophora audeoudi Rebel, 1935
Coleophora ballotella F.R., 1839
Coleophora basimaculella Mann, 1864
Coleophora bernoulliella Goeze, 1783
Coleophora bilineella Herrich-Schäffer, 1855
Coleophora bitlisella Baldizzone, 1994
Coleophora bivittella Staudinger, 1879
Coleophora breviuscula Staudinger, 1880
Coleophora caelebipennella Zeller, 1839
Coleophora calycotomella Stainton, 1869
Coleophora canariipennella Toll, 1959
Coleophora capillata Baldizzone, 1994
Coleophora cappadociae Baldizzone, 1994
Coleophora cartilaginella Christoph, 1872
Coleophora caucasica Stainton, 1867
Coleophora chamaedriella Bruand, [1852]
Coleophora christenseni Baldizzone, 1983
Coleophora confusa Staudinger, 1880
Coleophora congeriella Staudinger, 1859
Coleophora conspicuella Zeller, 1849
Coleophora conyzae Zeller, 1868
Coleophora coracipennella (Hübner, 1796)
Coleophora corsicella Walsingham, 1898
Coleophora craccella Valet, 1835
Coleophora crepidinella Zeller, 1847
Coleophora crispella Baldizzone, 1994
Coleophora cuprariella Zeller, 1847
Coleophora currucipennella Zeller, 1839
Coleophora deauratella Lienig & Zeller, 1846
Coleophora dianthi Herrich-Schäffer, 1855
Coleophora diffinis Staudinger, 1879
Coleophora dignella Toll, 1961
Coleophora dubiella Baker, 1888
Coleophora echinacea Falkovitsh, 1972
Coleophora egenella Toll, 1952
Coleophora eichleri Patzak, 1977
Coleophora etrusca Baldizzone, 1990
Coleophora eupreta Walsingham, 1907
Coleophora ferruginea Baldizzone, 1994
Coleophora fiorii Toll, 1953
Coleophora flaviella Mann, 1857
Coleophora flavilineella Toll, 1952
Coleophora flavipennella Duponchel, 1843
Coleophora follicularis Vallot, 1802
Coleophora fringillella Zeller, 1839
Coleophora frischella (Linnaeus, 1758)
Coleophora fuscicornis Zeller, 1847
Coleophora fuscociliella Zeller, 1849
Coleophora galbulipennella Zeller, 1848
Coleophora gallipennella (Hübner, 1796)
Coleophora gaviaepennella Fuchs, 1881
Coleophora gazella Toll, 1952
Coleophora glaucicolella Wood, 1892
Coleophora goluensis Baldizzone, 1994
Coleophora granulosella Staudinger, 1880
Coleophora gryphipennella (Hübner, 1796)
Coleophora gurunensis Baldizzone, 1994
Coleophora hartigi Toll, 1944
Coleophora hemerobiella Scopoli, 1763
Coleophora hieronella Zeller, 1849
Coleophora histricella Toll, 1957
Coleophora inflatae Stainton, 1857
Coleophora irvizensis Baldizzone, 1994
Coleophora isomoera Falkovitsh, 1972
Coleophora ispartae Baldizzone, 1994
Coleophora karakurti Baldizzone, 1994
Coleophora kasyi Toll, 1961
Coleophora krautzi Rebel, 1933
Coleophora kroneella Fuchs, 1899
Coleophora kuehnella Goeze, 1783
Coleophora lassella Staudinger, 1859
Coleophora laticostella Mann, 1859
Coleophora leucapennella (Hübner, 1796)
Coleophora limosipennella Duponchel, 1843
Coleophora lineariella Zeller, 1849
Coleophora lixella Zeller, 1849
Coleophora lusciniaepenella Treitschke, 1833
Coleophora luteolella Staudinger, 1880
Coleophora lutipennella Zeller, 1838
Coleophora lycaoniae Baldizzone, 1994
Coleophora malatiella Toll, 1952
Coleophora mausolella Chrétien, 1908
Coleophora mayrella (Hübner, [1813])
Coleophora medelichensis Krone, 1908
Coleophora milvipennis Zeller, 1839
Coleophora miniaxella Toll, 1952
Coleophora miserella Staudinger, 1880
Coleophora narbonensis Baldizzone, 1990
Coleophora necessaria Staudinger, 1880
Coleophora niditipennella Toll & Amsel, 1967
Coleophora nifridorsella Amsel, 1935
Coleophora niveicostella Zeller, 1839
Coleophora niveistrigella Heinemann & Wocke, [1877]
Coleophora nomgona Falkovitsh, 1975
Coleophora nutantella Mühlig & Frey, 1857
Coleophora obliterata Toll, 1952
Coleophora obtectella Zeller, 1849
Coleophora obviella Rebel, 1914
Coleophora occatella Staudinger, 1880
Coleophora ochrea Haworth, 1828
Coleophora ochripenella Zeller, 1849
Coleophora onopordiella Zeller, 1849
Coleophora oriolella Zeller, 1849
Coleophora ornatipennella (Hübner, 1796)
Coleophora paphlagoniae Baldizzone, 1994
Coleophora paraptarmica Toll & Amsel, 1967
Coleophora parcella Toll, 1952
Coleophora parthenica Meyrick, 1891
Coleophora partitella Zeller, 1849
Coleophora pellicornella Zerny, 1930
Coleophora pennella ([Denis & Schiffermüller], 1775)
Coleophora phlomidis Stainton, 1867
Coleophora phrygiae Baldizzone, 1994
Coleophora preisseckeri Toll, 1942
Coleophora protecta Walsingham, 1907
Coleophora pseudociconiella Toll, 1952
Coleophora ptarmicia Walsingham, 1910
Coleophora pyrenaica Baldizzone, 1980
Coleophora pyrrhulipennella Zeller, 1839
Coleophora rasthenica Meyrick, 1891
Coleophora riffelensis Rebel, 1913
Coleophora salicorniae Heinemann & Wocke, [1877]
Coleophora sarehma Toll, 1956
Coleophora saxicolella Duponchel, 1843
Coleophora serpylletorum Hering, 1889
Coleophora serratella (Linnaeus, 1761)
Coleophora serratulella Herrich-Schäffer, 1855
Coleophora setipalpella Staudinger, 1879
Coleophora silenenlla Herrich-Schäffer, 1855
Coleophora soffneriella Toll, 1961
Coleophora spiniferella Toll, 1952
Coleophora spissicornis Haworth, 1828
Coleophora stramentella Zeller, 1849
Coleophora subochracea Toll, 1952
Coleophora symphistropha Reznik, 1976
Coleophora taeniipennella Herrich-Schäffer, 1855
Coleophora tamesis Waters, 1929
Coleophora taurica Baldizzone, 1994
Coleophora tauricella Staudinger, 1880
Coleophora taygeti Baldizzone, 1983
Coleophora testudo Falkovitsh, 1973
Coleophora therinella Tengström, 1847
Coleophora thymi Hering, 1942
Coleophora treskaensis Toll & Amsel, 1967
Coleophora trifolii Curtis, 1832
Coleophora trigeminella Fuchs, 1881
Coleophora tripeniella Baldizzone, 1994
Coleophora tristella Staudinger, 1879
Coleophora turca Baldizzone, 1994
Coleophora univittella Staudinger, 1880
Coleophora valesianella Zeller, 1849
Coleophora versurella Zeller, 1849
Coleophora vicinella Zeller, 1849
Coleophora virgatella Zeller, 1849
Coleophora vulnerariae Zeller, 1839
Coleophora vulpecula Zeller, 1849
Coleophora vulpeculoides Toll, 1952
Coleophora walsinghami Baldizzone, 1990
Coleophora wiltshirei Toll, 1959
Coleophora wockeella Zeller, 1849
Coleophora xanthoargentea Toll, 1959
Coleophora zelleriella Heinemann, 1854
Metriotes lutarea Haworth, 1828
Parametriotes theae Kuznetsov, 1916

External links
Tentative Checklist of the Turkish Lepidoptera part 1
Tentative Checklist of the Turkish Lepidoptera part 2
Tentative Checklist of the Turkish Lepidoptera part 3
Fauna Europaea (European part of Turkey)

Turkey
Moths
Moths